We Got Married (Season 1) is the first season of We Got Married (우리 결혼했어요), a popular reality South Korean variety show and a segment of the Sunday Sunday Night program. First broadcast in 2008, the show pairs up Korean celebrities to show what life would be like if they were married. Each week, couples are assigned missions to complete, with candid interviews of the participants to reveal their thoughts and feelings.

With a new format and slightly different couples, newlyweds are given a mission to complete each week. As during the special pilot episode, interviewed participants provide a unique perspective on the ongoing relationship conflicts and developments. All of the recorded material is then played in front of the participants, MCs, and audience who add commentary or clarification.

Beginning with a Lunar New Year's Special in 2009 with three new couples, a new format is introduced into the show, first forecasted through the addition of Kangin and Lee Yoon Ji. Each couple is given a concept to portray; in Kangin and Lee Yoon Ji's case, a college couple living with a limited income. The show now consists of more special effects and editing in order to show each couple in a set atmosphere and theme.

Original couples
 Alex & Shin Ae (Ep 1-8, 13-34) →(total: 7 months)
 Crown J & Seo In Young (Ep 1-41) →(total: 10 months)
 Andy & Solbi (Ep 1-28) →(total: 7 months)
 Jung Hyung Don & Saori (Ep 1-8) →(total: 2 months)

Additional couples
 Lee Hwi-jae & Jo Yeo-jeong (Ep 9-17) →(total: 2 months)
 Kim Hyun-joong & Hwangbo (Ep 9-38) →(total: 7 months)
 Hwanhee & Hwayobi (Ep 25, 29-44) →(total: 5 months)
 Marco & Son Dam-bi (Ep 25, 29-44) →(total: 5 months)
 Choi Jin-young & Lee Hyun-ji (Ep 25)
 Kangin & Lee Yoon-ji (Ep 39-55) →(total: 5 months)
 Jung Hyung-don & Kim Taeyeon (Ep 42-54) →(total: 3 months)
 Shin Sung-rok & Kim Shin-young (Ep 42, 45-54) →(total: 3 months)
 Jun Jin & Lee Si-young (Ep 42, 45-55) →(total: 4 months)

Season I Episode summaries

References

External links 
 Official Website

We Got Married
2008 South Korean television seasons
2009 South Korean television seasons